Steve Botting (born December 5, 1959 in Montreal) is a Canadian sprint canoer who competed in the mid-1980s. At the 1984 Summer Olympics in Los Angeles, he finished fifth in the C-2 1000 m event and seventh in the C-2 1000 m

References
Sports-Reference.com profile

1959 births
Canoeists from Montreal
Canadian male canoeists
Canoeists at the 1984 Summer Olympics
Living people
Olympic canoeists of Canada